Hillel Seidel (9 October 1920 – 14 February 1999) was an Israeli politician who served as a member of the Knesset for the Independent Liberals and Likud between 1974 and 1981.

Biography
Born in Kraków in Poland, Seidel was educated in a heder and yeshiva, before attending the College of Economic Studies in Vilnius. A member of the Akiva youth movement, he was involved with the anti-Nazi underground movement in the Vilna Ghetto, and headed the underground in the Klooga concentration camp. After World War II he headed the Akiva movement in Poland until 1947, and was a commander of the Berihah movement until the end of 1947.

In 1948 he made aliyah to Israel,  where he became head of the Immigrant Absorption department of the World Confederation of General Zionists, a post he held until 1952. He also became secretary general of the HaOved HaTzioni movement and a member of the Progressive Party's directorate.

From 1952 until 1959 he was a member of the Histadrut's organising committee, and head of its Pensions department, before becoming head of the union's Immigrant Absorption department, a post he held until 1973.

In 1973 he was elected to the Knesset on the Independent Liberals list. However, on 15 February 1977 he left the party to establish the Ahdut faction, joining Likud. He was re-elected later that year on the Likud list and chaired the Public Petitions Committee. He lost his seat in the 1981 elections.

He died in 1999 at the age of 78.

References

External links

1920 births
1999 deaths
Jewish resistance members during the Holocaust
Vaivara concentration camp survivors
Polish emigrants to Mandatory Palestine
20th-century Israeli Jews
Israeli trade unionists
General Zionists politicians
Progressive Party (Israel) politicians
Independent Liberals (Israel) politicians
Likud politicians
Members of the 8th Knesset (1974–1977)
Members of the 9th Knesset (1977–1981)
Vilna Ghetto inmates